Stewart Island ('glowing skies', officially Stewart Island / Rakiura) is New Zealand's third-largest island, located  south of the South Island, across the Foveaux Strait. Its  coastline is deeply creased by Paterson Inlet (east), Port Pegasus (south), and Mason Bay (west). Flightless birds, including penguins, thrive because there are few introduced predators. Almost all the island is owned by the New Zealand government and over 80 per cent of the island is set aside as the Rakiura National Park.

Stewart Island's economy depends on fishing and summer tourism. Its permanent population was recorded at 408 people in the 2018 census, most of whom live in the settlement of Oban on the eastern side of the island. Ferries connect the settlement to Bluff in the South Island. Stewart Island/Rakiura is part of the Southland District for local government purposes.

History and naming 

Archaeology indicates that Stewart Island was settled in the 14th century, shortly after the Maori settled South Island.

The original Māori name, Te Punga o Te Waka a Māui, positions Stewart Island firmly at the heart of Māori mythology. Translated as "The Anchor Stone of Māui’s Canoe", it refers to the part played by the island in the legend of Māui and his crew, who from their canoe, the South Island, caught and raised the great fish, the North Island.

Rakiura is the commonly known Māori name. It is usually translated as "Glowing Skies", a reference to the aurora australis, the southern lights that are a phenomenon of southern latitudes.

For some, Rakiura is the abbreviated version of Te Rakiura a Te Rakitamau, translated as "great blush of Rakitamau", in reference to the latter's embarrassment when refused the hand in marriage of not one but two daughters of an island chief. According to Māori legend, a chief on the island named Te Rakitamau was married to a young woman who became terminally ill and implored him to marry her cousin after she died. Te Rakitamau paddled across Te Moana Tapokopoko a Tawhiki (Foveaux Strait) to the South Island where the cousin lived, only to discover she had recently married. He blushed with embarrassment; so the island was called Te Ura o Te Rakitamau.

Margaret Cameron-Ash claims that James Cook established the insularity of Stewart Island during his first Pacific voyage in 1770 but decided to hide his discovery for reasons of military and colonial policy. However, G. A. Mawer argues that Cook was simply unsure whether it was an island because his focus was on finding the southern extent of New Zealand, and conditions were unfavourable for more closely exploring a possible strait.

The strait was first charted by Owen Folger Smith, a New Yorker who had been in Sydney Harbour with Eber Bunker, from whom he probably learned of the eastern seal hunting. Smith charted the strait in the whaleboat of the sealing brig Union (out of New York) in 1804 and on his 1806 chart, it was called Smith's Straits.

The island received its English name in honour of William W. Stewart. He was first officer on the Pegasus, which visited in 1809, and he charted the large south-eastern harbour that now bears the ship's name (Port Pegasus) and determined the northern points of the island, proving that it was an island. In 1824, he initiated plans in England to establish a timber, flax and trading settlement at Stewart Island and sailed there in 1826, with it becoming known as Stewart's Island.

In 1841, the island was established as one of the three Provinces of New Zealand and was named New Leinster. However, the province existed on paper only and was abolished after only five years. With the passing of the New Zealand Constitution Act 1846, the province became part of New Munster, which entirely included the South Island. When New Munster was abolished in 1853, Stewart Island became part of Otago Province until 1861, when Southland Province split from Otago. In 1876, the provinces were abolished altogether.

For most of the twentieth century, "Stewart Island" was the official name, and the most commonly used. The name was officially altered to Stewart Island/Rakiura by the Ngāi Tahu Claims Settlement Act 1998, one of many such changes under the Ngāi Tahu treaty settlement.

Geography 

Its terrain is hilly and, like most of New Zealand, Stewart Island has an Oceanic climate. The north is dominated by the swampy valley of the Freshwater River. The river rises close to the northwestern coast and flows southeastwards into the large indentation of Paterson Inlet. The highest peak is Mount Anglem, close to the northern coast. It is one of a rim of ridges that surround Freshwater Valley.

The southern half is more uniformly undulating, rising to a ridge that runs south from the valley of the Rakeahua River, which also flows into Paterson Inlet. Notable twin rock formations in this region are known as Gog and Magog. In the southeast the land is somewhat lower, and is drained by the valleys of the Toitoi River, Lords River, and Heron River. South West Cape on this island is the southernmost point of the main islands of New Zealand.

Mason Bay, on the west side, is notable as a long sandy beach on an island where beaches are typically far more rugged. One suggestion is that the bay was formed in the aftershock of a meteorite impact in the Tasman Sea; however, no evidence has been found to support such a claim.

Three large and many small islands lie around the coast. The Titi / Muttonbird Islands group is between Stewart Island and Ruapuke Island, around Big South Cape Island, and off the southeastern coast. Other islands of interest include Bench Island, Native Island, and Ulva Island, all close to the mouth of Paterson Inlet, and Pearl Island, Anchorage Island, and Noble Island, close to Port Pegasus in the southwest. Further offshore The Snares are oceanic islands, a volcano and some smaller islets, that were never connected to the larger Stewart Island.

Stewart Island has a temperate climate. However, one travel guide mentions "frequent downpours that make 'boots and waterproof clothing mandatory", and another guide says that rainfall in Oban, the principal settlement, is  a year.

Owing to an anomaly in the magnetic latitude contours, this location is well placed for observing Aurora australis.

Approximately 18,000 years ago during the Last Glacial Maximum when sea levels were over 100 metres lower than present day levels, Stewart Island / Rakiura and its surrounding islands were connected to the rest of New Zealand. Sea levels began to rise 7,000 years ago, eventually separating Stewart Island / Rakiura from the mainland.

Demographics
Stewart Island covers  including the offshore islands, the most sizeable being Ruapuke Island, Codfish Island / Whenua Hou and Taukihepa / Big South Cape Island.

Stewart Island had a population of 408 at the 2018 New Zealand census, an increase of 30 people (7.9%) since the 2013 census, and an increase of 6 people (1.5%) since the 2006 census. There were 222 households. There were 216 males and 195 females, giving a sex ratio of 1.11 males per female. The median age was 49.3 years (compared with 37.4 years nationally), with 54 people (13.2%) aged under 15 years, 57 (14.0%) aged 15 to 29, 204 (50.0%) aged 30 to 64, and 90 (22.1%) aged 65 or older.

Ethnicities were 93.4% European/Pākehā, 19.9% Māori, 1.5% Pacific peoples, 0.7% Asian, and 2.2% other ethnicities (totals add to more than 100% since people could identify with multiple ethnicities).

The proportion of people born overseas was 16.9%, compared with 27.1% nationally.

Although some people objected to giving their religion, 67.6% had no religion, 23.5% were Christian, 0.7% were Buddhist and 2.9% had other religions.

Of those at least 15 years old, 84 (23.7%) people had a bachelor or higher degree, and 63 (17.8%) people had no formal qualifications. The median income was $33,500, compared with $31,800 nationally. 57 people (16.1%) earned over $70,000 compared to 17.2% nationally. The employment status of those at least 15 was that 207 (58.5%) people were employed full-time, 54 (15.3%) were part-time, and 3 (0.8%) were unemployed.

International Dark Sky Sanctuary
In January 2019, Stewart Island/ Rakiura was accredited as a Dark Sky Sanctuary by the International Dark-Sky Association.  This designation is given for sites in very remote locations to increase awareness of their dark sky characteristics and promote long term conservation. The application for accreditation was made by Venture Southland, an agency responsible for the region's economic and community development initiatives and tourism promotion, with the aim of attracting more visitors, particularly in the winter period.

Settlements 

The only town is Oban, on Halfmoon Bay.

A previous settlement, Port Pegasus, once boasted several stores and a post office, and was located on the southern coast of the island. It is now uninhabited, and is accessible only by boat or by an arduous hike through the island. Another site of former settlement is at Port William, a four-hour walk around the north coast from Oban, where immigrants from the Shetland Islands settled in the early 1870s. This was unsuccessful, and the settlers left within one to two years, most for sawmilling villages elsewhere on the island.

Since 1988 the electricity supply on Stewart Island has come from diesel generators; previously residents used their own private generators. As a consequence electric power is around three times more expensive than in the South Island, at NZ$0.59/kWh in 2016. After photovoltaic and wind generation were tested on the island, the government Provincial Growth Fund put $3.16 million towards building wind turbines on Stewart Island. The effort was defeated by local landowners who refused to grant access to the site through their property and general obstruction efforts by various parties.

Economy and communications 
Fishing has been, historically, the most important element of the economy of Stewart Island, and while it remains important, tourism has become the main source of income for islanders. There has also been some farming and forestry. Oban has mainly sealed main roads, and some gravel roads on the outskirts.

Stewart Island Flights links Ryan's Creek Aerodrome and Invercargill Airport and aircraft also land on the sand at Mason Bay, Doughboy Bay, and West Ruggedy Beach. A regular passenger ferry service runs between Bluff and Oban. The only ferry/barge link to the South Island for vehicles is to Bluff.

Stewart Island is able to receive most AM and FM radio stations broadcast in the Southland region. Television services are available via satellite using Sky or Freeview. Analogue terrestrial television services could be received on Stewart Island from the Hedgehope television transmitter located in the South Island prior to the analogue switch off on 28 April 2013.

Telecommunications 
Oban has ADSL broadband and phone services delivering speeds up to 24Mbit/s download.

Spark, 2degrees and Vodafone all offer 3G cellphone coverage. Spark also offers 4G 700 MHz coverage.

Spark provide 4G Wireless Broadband, with Vodafone providing 3G Rural Wireless Broadband.

All of the above services are delivered via a radio link from Bluff.

Government 

From 1841 to 1853, Stewart Island was governed as New Leinster Province, then as part of New Munster Province. From 1853 onwards, it was part of the Otago Province.

In local government today, Stewart Island is represented by one councilor on the Southland District Council. There is a Stewart Island/Rakiura Community Board to serve as the link between the community and the District Council. At the Southland Regional Council, it is part of the Invercargill-Rakiura ward.

Stewart Island shares with some other islands a certain relaxation in some of the rules governing commercial activities. For example, every transport service operated solely on Great Barrier Island, the Chatham Islands, or Stewart Island is exempt from the Transport Act of 1962.

Ecology

Flora 
Although the clay soil is not very fertile, the high rainfall and warm weather mean that the island is densely forested throughout. Native plants include the world's southernmost dense forest of podocarps (southern conifers) and hardwoods such as rātā and kāmahi in the lowland areas with mānuka shrubland at higher elevations. The trees are thought to have become established here since the last ice age from seeds brought across the strait by seabirds, which would explain why the beech trees that are so common in New Zealand, but whose seeds are dispersed by the wind rather than birds, are not found on Stewart Island.

Noeline Baker purchased land near Halfmoon Bay in the early 1930s and with a checklist by botanist Leonard Cockayne populated it with all the local indigenous plants. She gave the land and her house to the government in 1940, and today Moturau Moana is New Zealand's southernmost public garden.

Fauna 
There are many species of birds on Stewart Island that have been able to continue to thrive because of the relative absence of the cats, rats, stoats, ferrets, weasels and other predators that humans brought to the main islands. There are even more species of birds, including huge colonies of sooty shearwater and other seabirds, on The Snares and the other smaller islands offshore. The birds of Stewart Island include weka, kākā, albatross, the flightless Stewart Island kiwi, silvereyes, fantails, and kererū. The endangered yellow-eyed penguin has a significant number of breeding sites here, while the large colonies of sooty shearwaters on the offshore Muttonbird Islands are subject to muttonbirding, a sustainable harvesting programme managed by Rakiura Māori. Meanwhile, a small population of kakapo, a flightless parrot which is very close to extinction, was found on Stewart Island in 1977 and the birds subsequently moved to smaller islands (Codfish Island) for protection from feral cats. The South Island saddleback is similarly preserved. Stewart Island is the sole remaining breeding place of the critically endangered southern New Zealand dotterel.

The South Island giant moa (Dinornis robustus) occurred on the island, subfossil remains having been retrieved in its dunes.

Threats and preservation 
As the island has always been sparsely populated and there has never been very much logging, much of the original wildlife is intact, including species that have been devastated on the mainland post-colonisation. However, although habitats and wildlife were not threatened by invasive species historically, now there are populations of cats, rats and brushtail possums on the island, as well as a large population of white-tailed deer, which are hunted for meat and sport. The white-tailed deer were introduced to coastal areas, but there is also a small population of red deer confined to the inland areas. Almost all the island is owned by the New Zealand government and over 80 per cent of the island is set aside as the Rakiura National Park, New Zealand's newest national park. Many of the small offshore islands, including the Snares, are also protected.

Publicity and promotions 
Residents of Stewart Island have held a number of mock promotional fundraising events regarding a declaration of independence for the island, and to have it renamed to its original name of "Rakiura".

An effort to raise NZ$6,000 for a new swimming pool at the island's school involved selling 50-cent passports for the newly "independent" island. On 31 July 1970, a mock ceremony featured a declaration of independence, and the new republic's flag was unveiled.

These efforts were not serious attempts for independence, and Stewart Island remains a part of the New Zealand state.

References

Further reading

External links 

 Stewart Island News
 Stewart Island Promotion Association

 
Temperate broadleaf and mixed forests
Ecoregions of New Zealand
Islands of Southland, New Zealand
Foveaux Strait